The Cedar Mountain earthquake of 1932 was one of the largest seismic events in the US state of Nevada. The  7.3 earthquake struck at Cedar Mountain in Western Nevada. Shaking was felt as far as Oregon, Southern California, and the Rocky Mountains area. Nevada is the third most seismically active state in the United States due to ongoing rifting occurring within the North American Plate. Extension or thinning of the crust has resulted in numerous faults accommodating strain, at the same time, producing earthquakes. Since the earthquake occurred in a remote part of the state, damage was limited and no deaths were reported.

Tectonic setting
Western Nevada lies along the edge of the geologic province known as the Basin and Range. This area of rifting within the North American continent does so in a northwest-southeast direction. Extension of the crust has resulted in a diffuse area of low slip rate faults. This network of predominantly strike-slip and normal faults termed the Central Nevada Seismic Belt (CNSB) occasionally undergoes large "beltlike" earthquake sequences to help accommodate regional stresses with multiple sequences having occurred in the past 13,000 years. This earthquake occurred in the beginning portion of the most recent earthquake sequence, with the 1915 Pleasant Valley earthquake and 1954 Rainbow Mountain-Fairview Peak-Dixie Valley earthquakes also being associated. Further to the west near the border with California, earthquakes become predominantly strike slip along a shear zone known as the Walker Lane which has hosted earthquakes such as the 1872 Owens Valley earthquake.

Earthquake
Rupture was distributed across faults spanning three valleys and several mountain fronts including the Stewart-Monte Cristo Valley Fault Zone, and several small, unnamed faults in the Stewart and Gabbs Valleys. During the earthquake, many eyewitness reported lightning bolts and "mysterious lights" in Carson Valley. Shaking reached the maximum of X (Extreme) on the Mercalli intensity scale in Nevada, and overall, was felt for an area size of 850,000 square km. This complicated strike-slip earthquake between two mountain ranges was similar to that of the Owens Valley earthquake of 1872.

Impact
At the time of the earthquake, the region was uninhabited however, an adobe and stone cabin were destroyed with no injuries. Some damage to mine property and cabins were observed. At Mina, Hawthorne and Luning, the earthquake collapsed chimneys and shattered windows. Chimney damage were also reported in Fallon and the Reese River Valley. In Rhodes, a man suffered a fractured skull when the earthquake threw him against a train engine. The shaking created panic in Carson City, Virginia City, Reno and even in Sacramento, California.

References

Further reading

1932 earthquakes
Earthquakes in Nevada
Natural disasters in Nevada
1932 in Nevada
History of Mineral County, Nevada